Aggressive is a New York-based Latin Grammy Award-winning music video directing team of Alex Topaller and Daniel Shapiro. They have been described by Movie Creation Mag as "having a fascination with the wonderful, in the likes of the surrealist Rafal Olbinski" and "tenacious about pushing themselves and some overclocked hardware in order to create striking videos" by Video Static.

To date, Aggressive has directed music videos for Michael Jackson, Stone Temple Pilots, Juanes, Megadeth, Bloc Party, The Click Five, Kerli, Susan Justice, Black Label Society, Hoobastank, Killswitch Engage, The Script, Alexis Jordan and Lil' Rob. They have also directed commercials for brands such as Acura, Toyota, Bloomberg, Ralph Lauren, Anna Sui, Marc Ecko, Penfolds (RED), Dun & Bradstreet, MTV, Subway, AT&T, Kyocera, Cablevision, Topps, Caché and more.

Both coming up from VFX backgrounds, Topaller and Shapiro take a hands-on approach in all aspects of the process, from concept development, to shoot direction, all the way through post-production.

Accolades 
 2008 Winner Latin Grammy Award for Best Short Form Music Video (Juanes "Me Enamora")
 2008 Nominee "Video Of The Year" MTVLA Los Premios (Juanes "Me Enamora")
 2008 Winner Estonian Music Awards (Kerli "Walking on Air")
 2016 Best Experimental BassAwards (1976)
2019 Communication Arts Award of Excellence

Music videos

2015
 Tiësto featuring Jane Zhang – "Change Your World" 

2014
 Cris Cab – "Loves Me Not" 
2013
 Cris Cab featuring Pharrell – "Liar Liar" 
 Krewella – "Live for the Night"
2012
 Susan Justice – "Eat Dirt"
	
2011
 Michael Jackson – "Behind the Mask"

2010
 Stone Temple Pilots – "Cinnamon"
 Alexis Jordan – "Happiness"

2009
 The Script – "Breakeven"

2008
 Kerli – "Walking on Air"
 Juanes – "Gotas de Agua Dulce"
 Juanes – "Me Enamora"

2007
 The Click Five – "Jenny"
 Killswitch Engage – "The Arms of Sorrow"
 Megadeth – "À Tout le Monde (Set Me Free)"

2006
 Bloc Party – "I Still Remember"
 Black Label Society – "Concrete Jungle"
 Hoobastank – "Born to Lead"

2005
 Lil Rob – "Summer Nights"

References

External links 
 whatisaggressive.com

American music video directors
Entertainment companies based in New York City
Latin Grammy Award winners